Sønstevold is a Norwegian surname. Notable people with the surname include:

Anja Sønstevold (born 1992), Norwegian footballer 
Gunnar Sønstevold (1912–1991), Norwegian composer, husband of Maj
Maj Sønstevold (1917–1996), Swedish composer

Norwegian-language surnames